Jeffrey Allen Jones (born June 29, 1960) is an American college basketball coach and currently the head coach of the Old Dominion University basketball team. Jones took the helm of Old Dominion basketball on April 3, 2013. He previously served as head coach of the American Eagles and the Virginia Cavaliers.

Playing career

High school
Jones graduated from Apollo High School in Owensboro, Kentucky. He was inducted into the Apollo High School Hall of Fame. His father, Bob, is a former coach of Kentucky Wesleyan, which he led to the 1973 NCAA College Division title.

College
He played point guard at the University of Virginia from 1978 to 1982. As a four-year starter at Virginia, Jones was known as a leader and prolific passer. During his playing career, the Cavaliers compiled an overall record of 102-28, while he led the Cavaliers to two NCAA Tournaments and two NITs during his career. Virginia captured the 1980 NIT title, and advanced to the NCAA Final Four in 1981.
 
Jones finished his career as Virginia's all-time assists leader (598), and his 200 assists during the 1979–80 season was UVa's single-season record until both marks were later broken by John Crotty. Jones served as the team captain as a senior during the 1981–82 season and played in 129 games during his career. For his career, he averaged 6.6 points and 4.6 assists per game, while shooting 52.2 percent from the field and 74.3% from the free-throw line.

Despite being drafted by the NBA's Indiana Pacers in 1982, Jones never played as a professional. He graduated from Virginia in the same year with a Bachelor of Science degree in Psychology.

Coaching career

University of Virginia
After graduation he spent eight seasons as an assistant coach under Terry Holland at Virginia until tabbed the 8th head coach in Virginia Cavaliers history in 1990. He would go on to lead that program for eight seasons. He led Virginia to six postseason appearances (five NCAA, one NIT), a share of the 1995 ACC regular-season title and four 20-win campaigns.  He beat Roy Williams and #1 seeded Kansas in Kansas City to reach the Elite 8 in 1995.

Jones' tenure in Charlottesville crested at that point; he only had one winning season in his final three years. He resigned at the end of the 1997-98 season, having spent the first 20 years of his adult life at UVa as either a player, assistant coach, or head coach.

American University
Following a brief stint as associate head coach at Rhode Island, Jones was hired as the head coach at American University in 2000. After the school moved from the Colonial Athletic Association, he guided American to the 2002, 2004, 2008 and 2009 Patriot League regular season championships, and in 2002 he was honored as the Basketball America Patriot League Coach of the Year.  However, the team fell in the conference tournament title game each year from 2002 to 2004, failing to garner an NCAA tournament bid.

On December 22, 2007, Jones led AU to its first victory over the University of Maryland in the last 80 years.  Jones previously coached AU to victory over Florida State University, making him the only Patriot League coach to beat an ACC team.

On March 14, 2008, Jones led AU to its first NCAA tournament, as the Eagles beat Colgate 52–46. On March 22, 2008, Jones and the American University faced the Tennessee Volunteers at BJCC Arena in Birmingham, AL. Despite leading early on, American lost to Tennessee 72-57, ending American's NCAA trip.

The next year, Jones led the Eagles into the 2009 NCAA Division I men's basketball tournament on March 19, 2009. After holding a 14-point lead over Villanova early in the second half, the 14th-seeded Eagles let the game slip away at the end, falling to Villanova at the Wachovia Center.

Despite being a #2 seed in the 2011 Patriot League tournament, American was upset in the semifinal round, getting knocked off by Lafayette College in double overtime, 73-71.

Old Dominion University
On April 3, 2013, Jones was hired as the new head coach  at Old Dominion University.

Head coaching record

References

1960 births
Living people
American Eagles men's basketball coaches
American men's basketball coaches
American men's basketball players
Basketball coaches from Kentucky
Basketball players from Kentucky
College men's basketball head coaches in the United States
Indiana Pacers draft picks
Old Dominion Monarchs men's basketball coaches
Sportspeople from Owensboro, Kentucky
Point guards
Rhode Island Rams men's basketball coaches
Virginia Cavaliers men's basketball coaches
Virginia Cavaliers men's basketball players